Midnight Wire is the fifth studio album by Curved Air and was recorded in 1975. It marked another line-up change in the band, with Darryl Way and Sonja Kristina recruiting new musicians after the end of the reunion tour marked by the Curved Air - Live album. Kristina's friend Norma Tager, who had helped design the costumes she wore on stage from Curved Air's reunion in 1974 to their breakup in 1976, contributed all the lyrics to the songs.

Background and recording
The album's recording was marked by intense and bitter arguments between the band and producers Ron and Howard Albert, who often vehemently criticized the band members.

Track listing

Side one
"Woman On A One Night Stand" (Sonja Kristina, Norma Tager) – 5:06
"Day Breaks My Heart" (Darryl Way, Tager) – 4:38
"The Fool" (Way, Mick Jacques, Tager) – 4:27
"Pipe of Dreams" (Jacques) – 3:58

Side two
"Orange Street Blues" (Way, Tager) – 5:01
"Dance of Love" (Jacques, Way, Tager) – 4:36
"Midnight Wire" (Way, Tager) – 7:32

Personnel
Curved Air
 Sonja Kristina – lead vocals
 Darryl Way – violin
 Mick Jacques – guitars
 Stewart Copeland – drums
Guest musicians
 John G. Perry – bass guitar
 Peter Wood – keyboards
 Derek Damain – backing vocals on "The Fool"
Technical
Will Reid-Dick - engineer
Bob Searles, Liz Gilmore - sleeve design
"Thanks to Beric Wickens, Carolann Nicholls, Ian Copeland, Miles Copeland, Moray McMillin, Nick Blackburn"

References

Curved Air albums
1975 albums